Norman Mason (born 23 July 1952) is a maths teacher in Leicester at Wyggeston and Queen Elizabeth I College, and was a British sprint canoer who competed in the mid-1970s. He was eliminated in the repechages of the K-2 1000 m event at the 1976 Summer Olympics in Montréal.

References
Sports-Reference.com profile

1952 births
Canoeists at the 1976 Summer Olympics
Living people
Olympic canoeists of Great Britain
British male canoeists
21st-century English educators